Jack  has been used as a surname, primarily deriving from the Middle English and Older Scottish personal names such as Jak, Jagge and Jakke, in turn derived from pet forms of John, but perhaps in some cases Jack arose in Middle English from the Old French personal name Jacque(s) (i.e. James).

Frequency 
The occurrence of Jack as a surname is much less frequent than its use as a male forename. In 1990, in the United States, this surname is shared by about 0.007% of the population, though the geographical distribution of the surname has been broad since at least 1840, at which time there was a modest concentration of Jacks in Pennsylvania. Within the United Kingdom, the surname is considered almost exclusively Scottish. In the late-nineteenth century, the geographic distribution of Jacks in England was also broad, with concentration in North East England, Yorkshire and the Humber, and southern North West England.

Notable persons with this surname 
Aaron Jack (born 1975), member of the Kansas House of Representatives
Adrian Jack (born 1943), British composer
Alexander Jack (1805–1857), Scottish army officer in the East India Company 
Alister Jack (born 1963), Scottish politician
Andrew Jack (disambiguation)
Andy Jack (born 1923), English footballer
Annie Jack (née Hayr) (1839–1912), Canadian garden writer
Archibald Jack (1874–1939), New Zealand-born railway engineer and British Army officer
Badou Jack (born 1983), Swedish-Gambian boxer
Barnaby Jack (1977–2013) New Zealander hacker, programmer and computer security expert
Bob Jack (1876–1943), Scottish football player and manager
Caroline Jack (born 1978), South African field hockey player
Chris Jack (born 1978), New Zealand rugby union footballer
Cordel Jack (born 1982), West Indies cricketer
David Jack (disambiguation), several people
Denis Jack (born 1941), Scottish footballer
Donald Jack (1924–2003), Canadian novelist and playwright
Elaine L. Jack (born 1928), Canadian church leader, president of the Relief Society of the LDS Church
Eric Jack (born 1972), American football cornerback
Felisha Legette-Jack (born 1966), American university basketball coach
Fritz Jack (1879–1966), German fencer
Galactus Jack, real name Ben Jack (born 1982), British disc-jockey and producer
Garry Jack (born 1961), Australian rugby league footballer and coach
George Jack (architect) (1855–1931), British Arts and Crafts designer and architect
George W. Jack (1875–1924), United States district judge
Gilbert Jack (Jachaeus, Jacchaeus) (c. 1578–1628), Scottish philosopher
Gullah Jack (died 1822), Angolan-American conjurer and slave
Henry Jack (1917–1978), Scottish mathematician
Holly Jack, Scottish actress and director
Homer A. Jack (1916–1993), American Unitarian Universalist clergyman pacifist and social activist
Hugh Jack (born 1929), Australian long jumper
Hulan Jack (1905–1986), Saint Lucian-born New York politician
Ian Jack (born 1945), Scottish journalist
Isaac Allen Jack (1843–1903), Canadian lawyer and author
James Jack (disambiguation)
Janis Graham Jack (born 1946), United States federal judge
Jarrett Jack (born 1983), American basketball player
Jill Jack, American singer-songwriter
Jimmy Jack, Australian screenwriter, film director, actor and producer
John Jack (1932–1988), Scottish footballer
Keith Jack (born 1988), British actor and singer
Kelvin Jack (born 1976), Trinidadian football goalkeeper
Kema Jack (born 1982), international footballer for Papua New Guinea
Kenneth Jack (1924–2006), Australian watercolour artist
Kieren Jack (born 1987), Australian rules footballer
Lowell Jack (1925–2010), historian, city commissioner, mayor and president of chamber of commerce in Manhattan, Kansas
Mac Jack (1965–2020), South African politician
Sir Malcolm Jack (born 1946), Clerk of the House of Commons of the United Kingdom
Mathias Jack (born 1969), German footballer
Michael Jack (born 1946), English politician
Myles Jack (born 1995), American football linebacker
Nawal El Jack (born 1988), Sudanese sprinter
Patrick Churchill Jack (1808–1844), leader in the Republic of Texas
Richard Jack (1866–1952), Canadian painter 
Richard C. Jack, British animator and filmmaker
Robert Logan Jack (1845–1921), Australian geologist
Rodney Jack (born 1972), football player from Saint Vincent and the Grenadines
Rollo Jack (1902–1994), English footballer
Ross Jack (born 1959), Scottish football manager
Sir Roy Jack (1914–1977), New Zealand politician
Ryan Jack (born 1992), Scottish footballer
Samuel S. Jack (1905–1983), American Marine general, Navy Cross recipient
Sandy Jack (1922–2002), Scottish campaigner and consumer champion
Shervon Jack (born 1986), Saint Lucian international football player
Simon Jack (born 1971), British business journalist
Steven Jack (born 1970), South African cricketer
Stuart Jack (born 1949), British diplomat, Governor of the Cayman Islands 2005–2009
Summers Melville Jack (1852–1945), member of the U.S. House of Representatives
Thomas Jack (athlete) (1881–1961), British track and field athlete
Thomas Jack (born 1993), Australian DJ
Walter Jack (1874–1936), Scottish footballer
William Jack (disambiguation)

See also 
 Jacq, surname
 Jacque, given name and surname
Sumner Dagogo-Jack (born 1930), chairman of the National Electoral Commission of Nigeria, 1994–1998

References

Surnames
English-language surnames